Little Man (stylized as little man) is a 2005 American documentary film by Nicole Conn.  The film was intended to document surrogate pregnancy but the baby was delivered 100 days early so the film documents experiences of a family dealing with an extremely premature birth involving 158 days in a NICU (neonatal intensive care unit).

References

External links 
 
 

2005 documentary films
2005 films
Documentary films about health care
Autobiographical documentary films
2000s English-language films